Badri Spanderashvili (10 November 1969 – 7 September 2021) was a Georgian-Russian professional football coach and a former player.

Club career
He played for FC Dynamo Moscow, FC Rostov, FC Chernomorets Novorossiysk and FC Lokomotiv Nizhny Novgorod in the Russian Premier League.

References

External links
 

1969 births
2021 deaths
Footballers from Tbilisi
Soviet footballers
Russian footballers
Footballers from Georgia (country)
Association football midfielders
FC Chernomorets Novorossiysk players
FC Rostov players
FC Dynamo Moscow players
FC Dynamo Stavropol players
FC Spartak Vladikavkaz players
FC SKA Rostov-on-Don players
Russian football managers
Football managers from Georgia (country)
FC Lokomotiv Nizhny Novgorod players
FC SKA Rostov-on-Don managers
Russian Premier League players